The Cajones River, in the Ayotzintepec municipality, divides the Sierra Juárez, Oaxaca from the Sierra de Villa Alta in Oaxaca state, Mexico. 
It joins the Manso River to form the Tesechoacan River, a tributary of the Papaloapan River.

References

Geography of Mesoamerica
Rivers of Oaxaca
Papaloapan River